Deborah Elizabeth Meyer (born August 14, 1952), also known by her married name Deborah Weber, is an American former competition swimmer, a three-time Olympic champion, and a former world record-holder in four events.  Meyer won the 200-, 400-, and 800-meter freestyle swimming races in the 1968 Summer Olympics in Mexico City.  While she was still a 16-year-old student at Rio Americano High School in Sacramento, California, she became the first swimmer to win three individual gold medals in one Olympics, winning the 200-, 400-, and 800-meter freestyle swimming races. Katie Ledecky is the only other female swimmer to have done the same, in the 2016 Summer Olympics in Rio.

Meyer set world records in 200-meter, 400-meter, and 800-meter freestyle swimming events at the U.S. Olympics trials. Her winning times at the Olympic Games were 2:10.5 for the 200-meter, 4:31.8 for the 400-meter, and 9:24.0 for the 800-meter distances, all of them new or first-time Olympic records.

In 1968, the women's freestyle races at 200-meter and 800-meter distances were added to the Summer Olympics for the first time.  Before this, the longest race for women was the 400-meter freestyle, despite the fact that the male competitors had had the 1,500-meter freestyle race (the metric mile) for decades, dating back to 1896.

While overcoming her problems with asthma, Meyer broke 15 world records in swimming during her career.

Meyer broke 24 American records and won 19 Amateur Athletic Union (AAU) national championships.  In 1968, she won the James E. Sullivan Award.  In 1969, she was named Associated Press Athlete of the Year.  She was named Swimming World's World Swimmer of the Year in 1967, 1968 and 1969.  In 1972, Meyer retired from competitive swimming.  She was inducted into the International Swimming Hall of Fame in 1977, and the United States Olympic Hall of Fame in 1986.

On July 5, 2004, Meyer was inducted into the American National High School Hall of Fame.  Meyer uses the custom California automobile license plate "3GOLD68".

Meyer is married to Bill Weber. She owns the Debbie Meyer Swim School in Carmichael, California. According to the business website, Meyer has taught swimming in the area around Sacramento, since the 1970s, and she opened her own school in 1993. Along with teaching both children and adults to be safe in the water Meyer is coaching the Truckee Tahoe Swim Team in Truckee, California.
 
Meyer has a daughter, son, and step-daughter.

See also

 List of Olympic medalists in swimming (women)
 List of University of California, Los Angeles people
 World record progression 200 metres freestyle
 World record progression 400 metres freestyle
 World record progression 800 metres freestyle
 World record progression 1500 metres freestyle

References

External links
 
 
 
 
 

1952 births
Living people
American female freestyle swimmers
World record setters in swimming
James E. Sullivan Award recipients
Sportspeople from Annapolis, Maryland
Sportspeople from Sacramento, California
People from Truckee, California
Swimmers at the 1967 Pan American Games
Swimmers at the 1968 Summer Olympics
University of California, Los Angeles alumni
Medalists at the 1968 Summer Olympics
Pan American Games gold medalists for the United States
Olympic gold medalists for the United States in swimming
Pan American Games medalists in swimming
Medalists at the 1967 Pan American Games
21st-century American women